San Martín Palace (Palacio San Martín) is located facing Plaza San Martín in the Retiro neighbourhood of Buenos Aires, Argentina and  serves as the Ceremonial Headquarters for the Ministry of Foreign Relations.

History

The Beaux Arts style palace was designed for Mercedes Castellanos de Anchorena by the architect Alejandro Christophersen in 1905. Finished in 1909, the building was acquired by the Argentine government in 1936 and became the headquarters for the Ministry of Foreign Relations. A new headquarters was completed in 1993, and at present the palace serves as the Ceremonial Headquarters for the Ministry.

The palace contains many works of art by Argentine and American artists from the 20th century, including Antonio Berni, Pablo Curatella Manes, Lino Enea Spilimbergo, and Roberto Matta.

Gallery

References

Argentine Ministry of Foreign Relations 

Palaces in Buenos Aires
Government buildings in Argentina
National Historic Monuments of Argentina
Houses completed in 1909
Beaux-Arts architecture